Space Oddity is an American romantic comedy science fiction film directed by Kyra Sedgwick.

Premise
A man tries to secure insurance in order to go on a one-way trip to Mars.

Cast
 Kyle Allen as Alex McAllister
 Alexandra Shipp as Daisy Taylor
 Madeline Brewer as Liz
 Kevin Bacon as Jeff McAllister
 Simon Helberg as Dmitri
 Carrie Preston as Jane McAllister
 Arden Myrin as Lisa

Production
It was announced in June 2021 that Kyra Sedgwick would direct the film, written by Rebecca Banner, with Kyle Allen, Alexandra Shipp and Madeline Brewer set to star. In July, Kevin Bacon, Simon Helberg and Carrie Preston were added to the cast.

Filming began in June 2021, with production taking place throughout Rhode Island.

Release
The film had its premiere at the 2022 Tribeca Film Festival on June 12. It is set to be released by Samuel Goldwyn Films on March 31, 2023.

Reception

References

External links

American romantic comedy films
American science fiction films
Films shot in Rhode Island
2022 directorial debut films
Films directed by Kyra Sedgwick
2020s English-language films
2020s American films